Ruslan Andreyevich Surodin (born 26 October 1982) is a Russian former professional footballer.

Club career
He made his debut in the Russian Premier League in 2001 for FC Chernomorets Novorossiysk. He played 1 game in the UEFA Cup 2001–02 for FC Chernomorets Novorossiysk.

On 11 April 2009, during a game of Surodin's FC Nosta Novotroitsk against FC Chernomorets Novorossiysk, a Chernomorets fan broke onto the field and ran towards the Nosta's goalkeeper. Surodin punched the fan.

References

1982 births
Sportspeople from Pskov
Living people
Russian footballers
Association football midfielders
FC Chernomorets Novorossiysk players
FC Amkar Perm players
FC Luch Vladivostok players
Russian Premier League players
FC Tyumen players
FC Volgar Astrakhan players
FC Oryol players
FC Dynamo Stavropol players
FC Nosta Novotroitsk players